Edward J. Mulholland was the head coach for the Gonzaga University men's basketball team during the 1912–13 season, his junior year at the school in which he also played for the team. His record at Gonzaga stands at 4–2 (.667). Mulholland also played for the school's football and baseball teams.

References

Year of birth missing
Year of death missing
Gonzaga Bulldogs baseball players
Gonzaga Bulldogs football players
Gonzaga Bulldogs men's basketball coaches
Gonzaga Bulldogs men's basketball players
Player-coaches